Anna Adriana Burger (born 25 August 1967) is a South African former cricketer who played as a right-handed batter. She appeared in 18 One Day Internationals for South Africa between 1997 and 2000. She played domestic cricket for Northerns.

References

External links
 
 

1967 births
Living people
Cricketers from Cape Town
South African women cricketers
South Africa women One Day International cricketers
Northerns women cricketers
20th-century South African women
21st-century South African women